The Midlander was an overnight passenger train operated by the Western Australian Government Railways between Perth and Geraldton via the Midland line from September 1964 until July 1975.

History
The Midlander commenced operating on 2 September 1964 between Perth and Geraldton shortly after the purchase of the Midland Railway Company by the Western Australian Government Railways. It ceased on 28 July 1975, being replaced by road coaches.

The northbound service operated on a Wednesday night, returning south on Thursday night. It was operated with refurbished Western Australian Government Railways carriages painted maroon and ivory. These were used on weekends on the Albany Weekender.

References

Mid West (Western Australia)
Named passenger trains of Western Australia
Railway services introduced in 1964
Railway services discontinued in 1975
1964 establishments in Australia
1975 disestablishments in Australia
Discontinued railway services in Australia